Rachel Kelly Tucker (born 29 May 1981) is a Northern Irish West End and Broadway actress, best known for her portrayal of Elphaba in the hit musical Wicked. She most recently starred in Come from Away on Broadway, having originated the role on the West End. She has also starred in various other musicals and plays, including one alongside Sting (The Last Ship).

Early life and career
Tucker was born in Belfast, Northern Ireland, and grew up singing on the cabaret circuit from the age of nine with her father, Tommy (Tucker) Kelly and sister Margaret Kelly under the group's name Tucker Kelly and the Kelstar. She was a member of the Arts Youth Theatre during the late 1990s featuring in shows such as Ecstasy and Our Day Out. She then went on to feature in Michael Poyner's version of the Rockin Mikado as Katisha. In 2001, she competed in the Irish version of Popstars, featuring prominently in episode 3 where she is featured singing "Ain't No Mountain High Enough". Her contestant number was B0161. She also featured as a contestant with sister Margaret on Michael Barrymore's My Kind of Music singing "Man! I Feel Like a Woman!". She also competed in the talent show Star for a Night making the final with her performance of "Kids".

Tucker trained at the Royal Academy of Music. She worked with Any Dream Will Do winner Lee Mead in the 2005 United Kingdom tour of the Rock musical, Tommy as Sally Simpson. In December 2007, Tucker appeared as Dorothy Gale in the Royal Shakespeare Company adaptation of The Wizard of Oz at the Lyric Theatre in Belfast. The Stage described her performance as "looking and sounding uncannily like the legendary Garland". For her performance, she was nominated for an award in the 2008 TMA Awards. Tucker recorded a version of the civil rights anthem "Ain't Gonna Let Nobody Turn Me Around" which was used in a television advertisement for Libresse in 2005 entitled "March".

I'd Do Anything
Tucker was chosen as one of the twelve finalists on the show in which began in March 2008, appearing each week in the live show on Saturday evenings and the results shows which aired each Sunday. She made it to the semi-finals in week nine where she was eliminated on 25 May. In week six, she was in the bottom two with Sarah Lark, with Tucker having received the lowest number of viewers votes. In the results show on 4 May 2008, they sang "As If We Never Said Goodbye", from the musical Sunset Boulevard. Andrew Lloyd Webber chose to save Tucker and eliminate Lark, saying: "I have to think as a producer and I do think Rachel was rock solid."

Tucker was once again in the bottom two in week eight, the quarter-final stage of the series. She was in the sing-off for a second time, this time with Niamh Perry, with Perry having received the lowest number of viewers votes. They sang "Another Suitcase in Another Hall" from the musical Evita. Lloyd Webber chose to save Tucker and eliminate Perry.

At the semi-final stage, week nine, Tucker was in the bottom two for a third time, together with Samantha Barks, who had received the lowest number of viewers votes. They sang "Memory" from the musical Cats. Cameron Mackintosh joined the judging panel for this episode. Lloyd Webber chose to save Barks and eliminate Tucker saying: "Last night Cameron and I were both saying that we thought both of you would be fantastic Nancys and now here am I faced with this. But I've got to make a decision and I've got to think of where the show ultimately for Cameron is going to go and I think I have to go with you Samantha. A week after the show, Lloyd Webber said: "The fact is Cameron wanted Rachel to stay. He wanted Rachel and Samantha in the final from the beginning of the series. Rachel did a fantastic performance but I had to face up to the fact that she wouldn't have gone any further. What I may think professionally is sometimes different to what the public want. I saved Rachel three times and she still ended up in the bottom two."

Performances on I'd Do Anything

West End and Broadway stardom
In July 2008, Tucker took part in a private workshop performance of the first act of the sequel to The Phantom of The Opera (Love Never Dies) at Andrew Lloyd Webber's private Sydmonton Festival near his estate in Hampshire, in which she sang the role of Meg Giry. On 2 August 2008, in Belfast, she performed at the Gay Pride Festival. She sang a medley which included excerpts from Cabaret, "All That Jazz", "Maybe This Time" and "Don't Rain on My Parade". On 13 September 2008, she performed alongside fellow I'd Do Anything finalist Niamh Perry at the Proms in the Park, held at Belfast City Hall as part of the nationwide celebration of the BBC Last Night of the Proms. The following day, she performed at Andrew Lloyd Webber's Birthday in the Park' show in Hyde Park, London, singing "Light at the End of The Tunnel" from Starlight Express. In November 2008, Tucker filmed a West End special of The Weakest Link in which she was voted off first. The show was aired on BBC1 during the 2008 Christmas schedule. In late 2009, she was a judge on amateur comedy show Find Me the Funny and presented The Friday Show, a six-part entertainment series with Eamonn Holmes, both for BBC Northern Ireland.

We Will Rock You
From 22 September 2008, for one year, Tucker played Meat in the jukebox musical We Will Rock You, at the Dominion Theatre, London, under the direction of Christopher Renshaw. A review of the opening night performance of the show in The Stage newspaper said of Tucker's debut that she had "found the perfect stage for her large voice. Her rendition of "No-One but You (Only the Good Die Young)" is one of the highlights of a first act that works on many levels." Tucker was also the first understudy to Sabrina Aloueche for the role of Scaramouche, and played the role on many occasions to cover Aloueche's holidays.

Wicked
Tucker starred as Elphaba in the West End production of the musical Wicked, at the Apollo Victoria Theatre, under the direction of Joe Mantello. She replaced Alexia Khadime on 29 March 2010, starring opposite Louise Dearman (also her debut) as Glinda. Fans and critics alike have since praised Tucker's performance. For the entirety of her run, Nikki Davis-Jones was her understudy, and went on during Tucker's holidays and other absences. On 1 August 2011, it was revealed that she had extended her contract with the production into October 2012. In June 2012, she succeeded Kerry Ellis as the longest-running West End Elphaba.

For her portrayal of Elphaba, Tucker won a 2011 WhatsOnStage.com Award in the category of Best Takeover in a Role. She performed "The Wizard and I" at West End Live 2010 and 2012 Laurence Olivier, and "Defying Gravity" at Pride London. On 13 February 2011, she performed "Defying Gravity" as part of a theatre-themed episode of Dancing on Ice for ITV. Tucker also sang the same hit song at West End Live 2011 which was held at Trafalgar Square.

On 10 September 2011, Tucker was joined on stage by Stacey Solomon to sing "For Good" at the end of the show. This was in aid of BBC Children in Need Pop Goes the Musical, where a whole host of celebrities graced the stages of the West End of London to raise awareness for the charity's 2011 appeal. On 19 March 2012, Tucker won the West End Frame Award for Best Performance of a Song in a Musical for her performance of "Defying Gravity".

On 2 August 2012, it was announced that Tucker would be replaced by her former co-star Dearman, who is the only actress to have ever played both Elphaba and Glinda in the musical. Tucker was departing for maternity leave and exited the show at the scheduled cast change on 27 October 2012, as announced, after over 900 performances. Dearman took over the role on 29 October 2012.

On 18 August 2015, it was announced that Tucker would reprise the role of Elphaba in the Broadway production. She succeeded Caroline Bowman on 15 September 2015 at the Gershwin Theatre. Tucker played her final performance on 30 July 2016 and was replaced by Jennifer DiNoia. For her performance in the Broadway production, Tucker was the recipient of the 2016 Best Female Replacement Award at the 2016 Broadway.com Audience Awards.

On 20 May 2016, it was announced Tucker would be returning to the West End production of Wicked, leading the show's 10th Anniversary Cast in London. She replaced Emma Hatton on 5 September 2016 and played a strictly limited run as Elphaba until 28 January 2017. She was replaced by Willemijn Verkaik.

With over 1,000 performances both in the West End and on Broadway, Tucker remains one of the longest-running Elphabas in the show's history.

Farragut North
Tucker starred in Farragut North playing the role of Ida, which premiered in London at the Southwark Playhouse on 11 September 2013. Produced by Peter Huntley, in association with Daniel Krupnik and Southwark Playhouse, Directed by Guy Unsworth and with original music by Jude Obermüller, the production also starred Max Irons in the role of Stephen, and features Shaun Williamson, Aysha Kala, Josh O’Connor, Alain Terzoli and Andrew Whipp.

The Last Ship
On 12 February 2014, it was announced via Tucker's Twitter account that she will be making her Broadway debut in Sting's new musical The Last Ship which began at the Neil Simon Theatre on 30 September 2014. The musical follows the story of shipbuilders in the North East of England using music from Sting's album of the same name. It also starred Michael Esper and Jimmy Nail. The production closed on 24 January 2015.

Rachel Tucker: Back from Broadway 
On 19 April 2015, Tucker hosted two performances, one at 3pm and one at 7pm, at the St James theatre in London with the 7pm show being completely sold out. The special guests that appeared to sing songs with Tucker were George Macguire and Giles Terera, as well as a special performance with her own sister. Tucker sang 24 of her favourite songs, and also talked about her recent experience on Broadway.

Communicating Doors 
It was announced in Spring 2015, that Tucker was in rehearsals for an off-West End show called Communicating Doors at the Menier Chocolate Factory. The show began on 7 May 2015 and closed on 27 June 2015.

UK Tour 

In January 2017, it was announced that Tucker would be performing three intimate concerts at 'Live at Zédel' in London towards the end of March. The concerts were directed by Tucker's husband, Guy Retallack, with musical director Kris Rawlinson. The concerts sold-out quickly to which Tucker and Rawlinson subsequently announced another performance date on the same week. The concerts were very successful with fans and critics alike praising the performances of both Tucker and Rawlinson. At the start of March 2017, the pair announced that the collection of concerts would become an 11-date UK tour, visiting cities and towns such as Belfast, Cardiff, Bury St. Edmunds and Birmingham. The tour commenced in Belfast on 13 May and finished in Birmingham on 10 June. It was also announced that the pair would be visiting New York in September to perform the same concert.

During the tour, Tucker and Rawlinson announced via Facebook that the pair would be producing an album, 'On the Road', which would be a compilation of some of the songs that the pair performed on tour. The album was only available as a physical copy and could be bought online or at the remaining tour dates. The first 250 albums ordered online were signed and numbered by Tucker herself and were sent out a few weeks later.

Come From Away
It was announced on 10 October 2018, that Tucker will be playing the roles of Beverley and others in the London production of Come from Away from February 2019. She received a Laurence Olivier Award Nomination for Best Supporting Actress in a Musical for this role.

On 10 January 2020, it was announced that Tucker would leave the London production on 8 February 2020 alongside 9 other cast members. It was then announced on 22 January that she would reprise her roles as Beverley and others in the Broadway production from 3 March 2020 onward. Prior to this, Tucker performed in a concert performance of Alain Boublil & Claude-Michel Schönberg's The Pirate Queen on the 23 February 2020 at the London Coliseum in aid of Leukaemia UK.

John & Jen
In April 2021, it was announced that Tucker would star alongside Lewis Cornay in a new and updated production of Andrew Lippa and Tom Greenwald's 1995 musical John & Jen. The show was directed by Tucker's husband, Guy Retallack, and had a limited run from July 28, 2021, to August 21, 2021. John and Jen received praise from critics, with Theatre Weekly writing that the two leads had "an exquisite chemistry" and that Tucker was "unsurprisingly, incredible in the role of Jen" while Gay Times wrote "We were expecting big things from West End and Broadway star Rachel Tucker and she truly delivers" noting also that the production was "easily one of the most ambitious and polished musicals we’ve seen in a studio theatre".

Filmography

Television

Theatre Credits

Recordings
"Rain On Me" on the album More with Every Line - The Music of Tim Prottey-Jones (December 2010)
On 25 March 2013, it was announced that Tucker had been signed to Big Hand Recordings in a joint venture with Elate Studio and would release her debut solo album on 22 July 2013.

The Reason
On 11 August 2013, The Reason was released digitally and physical copies began to ship.

On 17 July 2013, it was announced that there will be a delay with the album release, with the new release date expected to be 12 August. The album launch concert went ahead on 25 July, effectively meaning those that had pre-ordered the album were not the first to hear the songs as planned.

On the Road
On 16 November 2017, On the Road was released digitally on iTunes.

Lessons
On 21 May 2021, Tucker's EP, Lessons was released digitally and on CD.

Personal life
On Valentine's Day 2008, Tucker was engaged to theatre director Guy Retallack. The couple married in 2009 and have one son, Benjamin, born in February 2013.

References

External links
 
 Official Website
 Rachel Tucker Fan Blog
 Rachel Tucker's cast page at Wicked the Musical

Musicians from Belfast
Women singers from Northern Ireland
Musical theatre actresses from Northern Ireland
Living people
1981 births
Alumni of the Royal Academy of Music